Streatham Hill railway station is one of three stations serving the district of Streatham, in the London Borough of Lambeth. The wooden station building at street level faces the busy Streatham High Road (A23) at the junction with Leigham Court Road. Services are operated by Southern.

Access to the platforms – which are in a cutting below street level and which continue under a bridge beneath the road – is possible via a pair of staircases or lifts.  A project to replace the staircases and introduce lift access was completed in 2009. The station is served by Class 377s.

History 

The railway station was opened by the West End of London and Crystal Palace Railway on 1 December 1856, originally being named 'Streatham'. Trains were operated from the outset by the London, Brighton and South Coast Railway. It was renamed Streatham & Brixton Hill on 1 September 1868 before receiving its present name on 1 January 1869.

There is a depot for maintenance of the passenger carriages at the London end of the station. Some of the lighting gantries above the sidings are remains of the pioneering "overhead electric" power supply that the LB&SCR introduced on this line on 12 May 1911.  This was abandoned in June 1928 when the Southern Railway replaced it with third rail electrification.

Services 
All services at Streatham Hill are operated by Southern using  EMUs.

The typical off-peak service in trains per hour is:
 4 tph to 
 2 tph to  via 
 2 tph to 

During the evening, the services between London Victoria and West Croydon do not run.

From May 2022 there will be 2 additional services to London Bridge via Tulse Hill, making use of the rarely-used curve of track at Leigham Junction.

Connections
London Buses routes 50, 57, 109, 118, 133, 159, 201, 250, 255, 319, 333, 417 and P13 and night routes N109, N133 and N137 serve the station.

See also 

The other stations in Streatham are:
Streatham railway station 
Streatham Common railway station

References

External links 

Early photographs of Streatham Hill station, from the Ideal Homes: Suburbia in Focus website

Railway stations in the London Borough of Lambeth
Former London, Brighton and South Coast Railway stations
Railway stations in Great Britain opened in 1856
Railway stations served by Govia Thameslink Railway
Streatham
DfT Category C1 stations